Ramya Krishnan (born 15 September 1970), also credited as Ramya Krishna (in the Telugu and Kannada film industries) is an Indian actress. She has appeared in over 260 films in five languages: Tamil, Telugu, Kannada, Malayalam, and Hindi. Ramya has won four Filmfare Awards, three Nandi Awards, and a Tamil Nadu State Film Award Special Prize.

She is known for playing Neelambari in Padayappa which won her the Filmfare Award for Best Actress – Tamil. She also won the Filmfare Award for Best Supporting Actress – Telugu for the 2009 comedy film Konchem Ishtam Konchem Kashtam. Ramya's portrayal of Sivagami Devi in the Baahubali series (2015–17) received universal acclaim. Both Baahubali: The Beginning (2015) and its sequel Baahubali 2: The Conclusion (2017) are among the highest grossing Indian films. Her performance in the franchise won her several accolades, including two Filmfare Awards for Best Supporting Actress – Telugu (2016 and 2018) and a Andra Pradesh State Nandi Award for Best Supporting Actress (2016).

Ramya Krishnan received international media attention for her performance in Baahubali for both sequels. She started to act in more Tamil television series airing on Sun TV and less on movies. Notable series include Vamsam, Shakthi and as a judge on Bigg Boss Jodigal. Following the COVID-19 diagnosis of Kamal Haasan in November 2021, Krishnan hosted Bigg Boss Tamil Season 5 and became the first, and so far only, woman to have hosted Bigg Boss Tamil.

Early life
Ramya was born on 15 September 1970 in Madras (present-day Chennai). She is the niece of the late Tamil film actor, comedian and former Member of Parliament, Rajya Sabha Cho Ramaswamy. She received initial training in Bharathanatyam, Western, and Kuchipudi dance forms and has given many stage performances.

Film career

Debut and early struggles (1985–1988)

She started her acting career with the Malayalam film Neram Pularumbol. Although this was the first movie where she acted, it had a delayed release in 1986. Her first release was Vellai Manasu in 1985, a Tamil movie opposite Y. G. Mahendra. Her first Telugu film was Bhalae Mithrulu (1986). Then she went on to play supporting roles in Tamil films which include Padikkadavan (1985) starring Rajinikanth and Per Sollum Pillai (1987) starring Kamal Haasan. In Telugu, she starred with Rajendra Prasad in Madana Gopaludu (1987), Bhama Kalapam (1988), Asthulu Anthasthulu (1988) and Bava Marudula Saval (1988). She worked in Malayalam films such as Orkkappurathu, Aryan and Anuragi with Mohanlal. She enjoyed success in Kannada movies as well. One of her earlier roles as heroine was in Krishna Rukmini opposite superstar Vishnuvardhan. She played a small role in the Hindi film Dayavan that starred veteran actor Vinod Khanna.

Breakthrough in Telugu and Hindi (1989–1998)

After a series of failures in both Tamil and Telugu, she achieved fame through K. Viswanath's Sutradharulu, released in 1989. The film went onto win National Film Award for Best Feature Film in Telugu. After this, she featured in many movies and emerged as a leading actress in Tollywood (Telugu film Industry) alongside many other famous south Indian actresses. Her breakthrough came from K. Raghavendra Rao directorial movies where she emerged as a commercial romantic diva, due to successful movies such as Alludugaru (1990), Allari Mogudu (1992), Major Chandrakanth (1993) along with Mohan Babu and Allari Priyudu (1993) along with Rajasekhar. She played the role of a devoted wife of Sri Annamacharya, which was played by Nagarjuna in the film Annamayya (1997). In 1998, she played a leading role in Kante Koothurne Kanu. She received a Nandi Award for Best Actress from the Government of Andhra Pradesh for her performance in the film. Her biggest Kannada hits include Gadibidi Ganda (1993) and Mangalyam Tantunanena (1998) with Ravichandran.

Ramya made her debut as a heroine in Hindi films with Yash Chopra's Parampara (1993). She acted in a few more Hindi films including Subhash Ghai's Khalnayak (1993), Mahesh Bhatt's Chaahat (1996), David Dhawan's Banarasi Babu (1997) Bade Miyan Chote Miyan (1998) along with Amitabh Bachchan and Govinda and Shapath with Mithun Chakraborty.

Comeback to Tamil cinema and debut in TV serials (1999–2009)

After a four-year break from Tamil cinema, in 1999, Krishnan played the female antagonist in Padayappa opposite Rajinikanth. The critic from Rediff stated "Ramya does a fantastic job. She is vicious to her dying breath, when she declares she will revenge herself in her next life. She does a fabulous tandav of rage when her father commits suicide". She went onto receive several awards including Filmfare Award for Best Actress - Tamil and Tamil Nadu State Film Award Special Prize.  She then starred in commercially successful films like Budget Padmanabhan and Panchatanthiram. The critic from Screen called her performance in Panchatanthiram "one of the finest performances ever".
Ramya has also acted in many devotional films including Ammoru (1995), Rajakali Amman (2000), Nageswari (2001), Sri Raja Rajeshwari (2001) and Annai Kaligambal (2003).

Her notable film in Malayalam was Ore Kadal (2007) with Mammootty, which received the National Film Award for Best Feature Film in Malayalam. She had acted as the mother-in-law of N. T. Rama Rao Jr. in the movie Naa Alludu (2005) marked for her role and later in the film Konchem Ishtam Konchem Kashtam (2009). She also appeared in a guest role in item songs in Tollywood and Kollywood.

She turned to acting in TV serials before hosting a game show called Thanga Vettai, on Sun TV, and judging a dance show, Jodi Number One, on Vijay TV. Krishnan is stepping in television serials for the first time. She was seen in Kalasam in two roles. One of them is Neelambari, a character she played in the Rajinikanth starrer Padayappa. In 2009, she appeared in Suresh Krissna's Arumugam and Rama Narayanan's Kutti Pisasu.

Versatility in roles (2010–2014)

She continued her stay under the Sun TV banner to act in Thangam, Vamsam and  Rajakumari. Later, Krishnan acted in supporting roles in Telugu as Ranga The Donga (2010), Yamudiki Mogudu (2012) and in Kannada as Sweety Nanna Jodi (2013 and Maanikya (2014). Krishna acted as Goddess Parvati in Sri Vasavi Kanyaka Parameswari Charitra (2014) with Suman.

2015–present

In 2015, Krishnan acted in S.S. Rajamouli's film  Baahubali: The Beginning and its sequel Baahubali: The Conclusion, where she played Rajamata Sivagami Devi. Her performance met with the critical acclaim and the films became the highest grossing Indian films. Sangeetha Devi Dundoo praised Ramya's performance and stated "Ramya Krishnan once again aces with her part". She received the Filmfare Award for Best Supporting Actress - Telugu for both films. After the success of Baahubali, she reunited with Mohan Babu in Mama Manchu Alludu Kanchu (2015) and Nagarjuna in Soggade Chinni Nayana (2016). In 2019, she played a porn actress in Super Deluxe directed by Thiagarajan Kumararaja. Srivatsan S from The Hindu stated her role as "boldest role yet".

She made her debut in the digital platform with Queen in 2019. The critic from India Today stated "Ramya Krishnan as the failing actress and a budding politician (the later part of Shakthi's life) puts in a measured performance and it is what stands out in a series that relies heavily on performances". In 2022, Ramya appeared in Dharma Productions and Puri Jagannadh's sports action film Liger.

Personal life
She married Telugu film director Krishna Vamsi on 12 June 2003. The couple have a son.

Awards

References

External links

 
 

Living people
1970 births
Actresses in Hindi cinema
Actresses in Kannada cinema
Actresses in Malayalam cinema
Actresses in Tamil cinema
Actresses in Telugu cinema
Indian film actresses
Indian game show hosts
Indian women television presenters
Actresses from Chennai
Filmfare Awards South winners
Nandi Award winners
Tamil Nadu State Film Awards winners
20th-century Indian actresses
21st-century Indian actresses
Actresses in Tamil television
Actresses in Telugu television
South Indian International Movie Awards winners